Rhein, also known as cassic acid, is a substance in the anthraquinone group obtained from rhubarb. Like all such substances, rhein is a cathartic. Rhein is commonly found as a glycoside such as rhein-8-glucoside or glucorhein. Rhein was first isolated in 1895. It is found in rhubarb species like Rheum undulatum and Rheum palmatum as well as in Cassia reticulata.

Originally the rhubarb plant which contains rhein was used as a laxative. It was believed that rhein along with other anthraquinone glycosides imparted this activity.

Rhein has been reevaluated as an antibacterial agent against Staphylococcus aureus in 2008. Synergy or partial synergy has been demonstrated between rhein and the antibiotics oxacillin and ampicillin.

Rhein has been shown to inhibit the fat mass and obesity-associated protein, an enzyme responsible for removing the methylation from N6-methyladenosine in nucleic acids.

The pharmacokinetics of rhein have not been intensively studied in humans, but at least one study in healthy male volunteers found that rhein was better absorbed from oral administration of rhubarb than from a retention enema. Rhein (at an oral dose of 50 mg twice per day) was shown to be safe when administered for five days to elderly patients with chronic congestive heart failure.

See also 
 Diacerein

References 

CYP2D6 inhibitors
Dihydroxyanthraquinones